Skënder Zogu (born 3 June 1933) is an Albanian author and member of the House of Zogu. As the son of Prince Xhelal Zogu, he is first in the line of succession to the former Albanian throne after his first cousin once removed, Leka, Crown Prince of Albania.

Biography

Zogu was born to Prince Xhelal Zogu (half-brother of Zog I of Albania) and Faika Minxhalliu on 3 June 1933 in Davos, Switzerland. He studied at the Huddersfield College of Technology, which later became the University of Huddersfield. During his time at university, he was the vice president and then president of the Student Union. After graduating with a degree in Textile and Color Chemistry, Zogu worker for a period of time for Francolor. He went on to work as a textile sales manager at KVK Danemark.

On 9 April 1961, Zogu was present when Zog I of Albania died while in exile at Hôpital Foch in Suresnes, Hauts-de-Seine, France. Zogu organized the funeral, which was held two days later. Zogu recounts his uncle dying in a memoir released in 2017. The book, which has a translated title of A life in the service of the Albanian nation - memories of exile, was given a positive review by writer Roland Qafoku. Qafoku wrote, "The book has an unprecedented gallery of characters. With the good, the bad, the positive and the negative, Skender Zogu in fact, in this book, has brought out their best sides... The story of the royal family and the Zog kingdom itself would be incomplete without this book!" Sprint News stated the book was "A brilliant example of approaching the truth... Skender Zogu writes with simplicity and truth about the experiences of the time." The book received positive reviews from other sources as well. The book was released in English in 2020.

On 10 November 1962, Zogu married to French national Jacqueline Cosme. Together they had a daughter, Virginie Alexandra Geraldine Zogu, born 25 January 1963 in Compiègne, France. Virginie married Mr. Raphaël de Urresti, who was born 1959.

From 1980 until 1995 Zogu was the head of the Albanian Royal Court in exile Press Office. In 1993, he returned to Albania after living in exile for 54 years.

On 16 November 2012, Zogu joined Ambassador Ylljet Aliçka to repatriate the remains of Zog I from France to Albania, where he was placed in the royal family mausoleum.

Zogu is known for protecting the legacy of the royal family members. In 2017, Zogu criticized Albanian politician Alfred Peza who had written disparaging comments about the royal family. Zogu stated Peza "was a man without culture and without character" who had no chance of meeting the royal family or entering the palace. In 2018, he defended the former king against statements Zog I did not know how to write in Albanian.

Zogu retired in 1999. As of 2019, he lives in Chantilly, France. He is active in the Legality Movement Party, a conservative monarchist party in Albania.

Bibliography
Zogu, Skender. Një jetë në shërbim të kombit shqiptar-kujtime mërgimi (translated: A life in the service of the Albanian nation - memories of exile).

Filmography

Dynastic honours
  House of Zogu: Order of Skanderbeg (awarded by King Leka I)
  House of Zogu: Order of Fidelity (awarded by Leka, Crown Prince of Albania)

Further reading
Historie de l'Albanie et de sa Maison Royale 1443-2007 by Dr. Patrice Najbor (translated: The History of Albania and its Royal Family 1443-2007)

Ancestry

References

Living people
1933 births
Skender
21st-century Albanian writers
Albanian male writers